Everton Antônio Pereira (born November 15, 1979 in São José do Rio Preto), commonly known as Everton, is a professional footballer where he plays as a midfielder.

He defended América-SP from 1995 to 1999.

References

External links
 
 Player profile on jagiellonia.neostrada.pl 

Living people
1979 births
Brazilian footballers
América Futebol Clube (SP) players
Club Athletico Paranaense players
Esporte Clube Taubaté players
SC Tavriya Simferopol players
FC Vilnius players
Jagiellonia Białystok players
Tarxien Rainbows F.C. players
Brazilian expatriate footballers
Ukrainian Premier League players
Ekstraklasa players
Expatriate footballers in Ukraine
Brazilian expatriate sportspeople in Ukraine
Expatriate footballers in Poland
Brazilian expatriate sportspeople in Poland
Expatriate footballers in Malta
Association football midfielders
People from São José do Rio Preto
Footballers from São Paulo (state)